Post Oak is an unincorporated community in Johnson County, in the U.S. state of Missouri.

History
Post Oak was laid out in the 1850s, and named after nearby Post Oak Creek. The Post Oak post office remained in operation until it was discontinued in 1954.

References

Unincorporated communities in Missouri
Unincorporated communities in Johnson County, Missouri